The Plant Protection and Inspection Services unit is an agency of the Ministry of Agriculture of Israel. PPIS handles phytosanitary matters both within Israel and in foreign trade. In pursuit of that purpose, it operates offices both within the country and in its foreign embassies, and acts as representative to some international bodies such as the IPPC (International Plant Protection Convention) and the EPPO (European and Mediterranean Plant Protection Organization).

External links

References

Agriculture in Israel
Phytosanitary authorities
Export and import control
Regulators of biotechnology products
Foreign trade of Israel